Freddie Lee Bynum Jr. (born March 15, 1980) is an American former professional baseball shortstop and outfielder. He played in Major League Baseball (MLB) for the Chicago Cubs, Oakland Athletics, and Baltimore Orioles. Bynum also played in Nippon Professional Baseball for Orix Buffaloes.

Career

Oakland Athletics
Bynum was selected by the Oakland Athletics in the second round (60th overall) of the 2000 MLB draft. He made his major league debut with the A's on August 30, 2005, where he entered the game as a pinch runner in the tenth inning before moving to left field. Bynum played in seven games with Oakland in 2005, batting .286 with an RBI.

Chicago Cubs
On March 31, 2006, the Cubs acquired Bynum from the A's in a three-way deal. The Cubs traded pitcher John Koronka to the Texas Rangers, while the Rangers sent pitcher Juan Dominguez to the A's to complete the deal.

Baltimore Orioles

On December 6, 2006, Bynum was dealt to the Baltimore Orioles for a player to be named later, who became Kevin Hart. He was designated for assignment by the Orioles on June 22, 2008, and was sent outright to the minors a few days later. However, he was recalled by the Orioles on July 1. He was sent outright to the minors once again on July 19.

Washington Nationals 
On December 13, 2008, Bynum signed a minor league contract with the Washington Nationals and received an invitation to spring training.

Chicago White Sox
Bynum signed a minor league contract with the Chicago White Sox on December 13, 2009, but was released early on in Spring Training.

Orix Buffaloes
Upon his release from the White Sox, Bynum was signed by the Orix Buffaloes of the Japanese Baseball League in February 2010.

St. Louis Cardinals
On January 19, 2011, Bynum signed a minor league deal with the St. Louis Cardinals.

Somerset Patriots
On April 26, 2012, Bynum signed with the Somerset Patriots of the Atlantic League of Professional Baseball. He became a free agent after the season.

References

External links

1980 births
Living people
Baseball players from North Carolina
American expatriate baseball players in Canada
American expatriate baseball players in Japan
Major League Baseball left fielders
Major League Baseball second basemen
Major League Baseball shortstops
Oakland Athletics players
Chicago Cubs players
Baltimore Orioles players
Chicago White Sox players
Orix Buffaloes players
African-American baseball players
People from Wilson, North Carolina
Vancouver Canadians players
Modesto A's players
Visalia Oaks players
Midland RockHounds players
Sacramento River Cats players
Iowa Cubs players
Frederick Keys players
Pitt Bulldogs baseball players
Delmarva Shorebirds players
Bowie Baysox players
Norfolk Tides players
Gulf Coast Nationals players
Harrisburg Senators players
Syracuse Chiefs players
Memphis Redbirds players
Somerset Patriots players
21st-century African-American sportspeople
20th-century African-American people